The Ray Mountains is a mountain range in central Alaska named for the Ray River, itself named for United States Army Captain Patrick Henry Ray, who established a meteorological station in Barrow, Alaska, in 1881. The mountains are within the Yukon-Tanana Uplands, an area of low mountain ranges that also includes the White Mountains. Other notable peaks include Wolf Mountain, Mount Henry Eakin, the Kokrines Hills, and Moran Dome.

References 

 
 Gates, Douglas. "Yukon-Tanana Uplands", Greatlandofalaska.com. Accessed February 17, 2009.
 Bureau of Land Management. Kanuti NWR/Ray Mountains/Hogatza River Earth Cover Classification, Department of the Interior. September 2002. Accessed February 17, 2009.

Further reading
 Yeend, Warren. Glaciation of the Ray Mountains, Central Alaska, in U.S. Geological Survey Staff, Geological survey research 1971; Chapter D: U.S. Geological Survey Professional Paper 750-D, pp. D122-D126.

Landforms of Yukon–Koyukuk Census Area, Alaska
Mountain ranges of Alaska
Mountains of Unorganized Borough, Alaska